Elise "Lee" Harney (July 22, 1924 – November 1, 1989) was a female pitcher who played from  through  in the All-American Girls Professional Baseball League. She batted and threw right-handed.

A native of Franklin County, Illinois, Elise Harney became one of the sixty founding members of the All-American Girls Professional Baseball League. While at school, she made her mark as a fast-pitch softball hurler in Chicago before joining the league. However, she ended her career prematurely after developing a sore pitching arm while trying to adapt to a new pitching motion in 1947.

In 1943, Harney joined a balanced Kenosha team that included players as very talented pitcher Helen Nicol, as well as Ann Harnett, Phyllis Koehn, Shirley Jameson, Pauline Pirok and Audrey Wagner, notably for their hitting abilities and strong defense. Harney relished her debut in the league, ending with a 19–19 record for a .500 percentage, and posted a 2.93 earned run average while striking out 102 batters. Her teammate Nicol led the league in wins (31), ERA (1.81) and strikeouts (220), being honored Pitcher of the Year. Kenosha collected the third-best record at 56–56, but won the second-half title and earned a ticket to the playoffs. The Comets were swept by Racine in three games during the first round. Inexplicably, Nicol failed in the playoffs and went 0–2 with a 4.50 ERA. Besides this, Harney also appeared in the league's first All-Star Game during the midseason, which was played under temporary lights at Wrigley Field, between two teams composed of Blue Sox and Peaches players versus Comets and Belles players. It was also the first night game ever played in the venerable ballpark (July 1, 1943).

As a result of the success of the AAGPBL in its first year, civic groups in each of the four cities agreed to finance their own franchises. Then, the newly formed Milwaukee Chicks and Minneapolis Millerettes entered the league in 1944 and played their home games at American Association ball parks during the time periods the Milwaukee Brewers and Minneapolis Millers male teams were on road trips. As expected, the games schedule and frequent travels from one city to another increased significantly. Nevertheless, Harney went 18–14 (.562) with 88 strikeouts and a 2.84 ERA. In comparison, her teammate Nicol slipped to 17–11 (.608) but led the league with 0.93 ERA. The Comets, now managed by Marty McManus, again placed third (62–54) and made the playoffs, this time thanks to a first-half title. Kenosha took a three-two advantage in the best-of-seven series against the expansion Chicks, but Nicol lost three of four pitching matchups with Connie Wisniewski, including a 2–1, 13 inning-duel, and finished 2–3 with a 1.09 in the finals.

In 1945, Eddie Stumpf became the third different manager of Kenosha in three years, but the team suffered the worst season in franchise history. The Comets ended in last place with a 41–69 record, 26 games out of the first spot in the league. In the collective debacle, Nicol (24) and Harney (14) earned 38 of the 41 victories of their team.

But Harney developed arm and elbow problems after being overused in the previous seasons. She started 1946 with Kenosha and was traded to the expansion Fort Wayne Daisies during the midseason, compiling a collective record of 10–20 in 33 appearances that year.

Harney, who never left school while she was playing for Kenosha, graduated from the University of Wisconsin in 1947.

Career statistics
Batting 

Pitching

References

External links
"Honoring" Female Baseball Players With the Lipstick They Were Required to Wear. de la Cretaz, Britni (May 10, 2018). Racked. Retrieved 2019-04-14.

All-American Girls Professional Baseball League players
Kenosha Comets players
Fort Wayne Daisies players
Baseball players from Illinois
People from Franklin County, Illinois
Sportspeople from Kenosha, Wisconsin
Sportspeople from Illinois
University of Wisconsin–Madison alumni
1924 births
1989 deaths
20th-century American women
20th-century American people